Raj Kiran may refer to:

 Raj Kiran (actor) (born 1949), Bollywood actor
 Rajkiran (born 1954), Tamil actor